This is a directory of lists of geological features on planets excepting Earth, moons and asteroids ordered by increasing distance from the Sun.

Mercury 

 List of craters on Mercury
 List of geological features on Mercury

Venus 

 List of craters on Venus
 List of coronae on Venus
 List of mountains on Venus
 List of terrae on Venus

Earth 

 see also Geology, Plate tectonics, Geologic eras, Geological history of Earth

The Moon 

 List of craters on the Moon
 List of maria on the Moon
 List of mountains on the Moon
 List of valleys on the Moon

Mars 

 List of craters on Mars
 List of mountains on Mars
 List of rocks on Mars
 List of valles on Mars
 List of chasmata on Mars
 List of plains on Mars
 List of terrae on Mars
 List of areas of chaos terrain on Mars
 List of surface features of Mars seen by the Spirit rover
 List of surface features of Mars seen by the Opportunity rover
 see also List of Martian canals

Phobos and Deimos

Asteroids 

 List of geological features on Ceres
 List of geological features on Vesta
 List of geological features on 243 Ida and Dactyl
 List of craters on 253 Mathilde
 List of geological features on 433 Eros
 List of geological features on 951 Gaspra
 List of geological features on 25143 Itokawa

Jupiter

Io 

 List of mountains on Io
 List of volcanic features on Io
 List of regions on Io

Europa 

 List of craters on Europa
 List of lineae on Europa
 List of geological features on Europa

Ganymede 

 List of craters on Ganymede
 List of geological features on Ganymede

Callisto 

 List of craters on Callisto
 List of geological features on Callisto

Saturn 

 List of geological features on Mimas
 List of geological features on Enceladus
 List of geological features on Tethys
 List of geological features on Dione
 List of geological features on Rhea
 List of geological features on Titan
 List of geological features on Hyperion
 List of geological features on Iapetus
 List of geological features on Phoebe

Uranus 

 List of geological features on Puck
 List of geological features on Miranda
 List of geological features on Ariel
 List of geological features on Umbriel
 List of geological features on Titania
 List of geological features on Oberon

Neptune 

 List of geological features on Proteus
 List of geological features on Triton

Kuiper belt 
 List of geological features on Pluto
 List of geological features on Charon

See also 
 Lists of astronomical objects
 Geology of solar terrestrial planets
 Planetary nomenclature
 Planetary geology
 List of extraterrestrial dune fields
 List of tallest mountains in the Solar System
 List of craters in the Solar System
 List of largest craters in the Solar System
 List of largest rifts, canyons and valleys in the Solar System

External links 
 USGS Gazetteer of Planetary Nomenclature (also includes nomenclature for satellites and minor planets/asteroids)
 The Nine Planets - Multimedia Tour of the solar system

Planetary geology